Richard Palmer Kaleioku Smart  (1913–1992) was a musical theatre actor and singer who became owner of the largest private ranch in Hawaii.

Early life
Richard Palmer Kaleioku Smart was born May 21, 1913, in Honolulu. In 1914 the family traveled to Europe, where his mother gave birth to a sister Elizabeth Ella Smart in Paris. By this time World War I was starting, so they hurriedly traveled back to New York City, where the sister died. 
His mother (born Annie Thelma Kahiluonapuaapiilani Parker) died shortly after this in San Francisco on November 14, 1914, from tuberculosis. A year later, his father Henry Gaillard Smart (son of a Virginia clergyman) died in November 1915, just after contesting the will. 
He was raised by his part-Hawaiian maternal grandmother, born Elizabeth Jane Lanakila Dowsett, by then remarried to Frederick Knight in San Francisco, usually called "Aunt Tootsie". 
Although he had many cousins, he became the sole owner of the Parker Ranch on Hawaii Island, founded by his 5th generation ancestor John Palmer Parker (1790–1868). The ranch was managed by Alfred Wellington Carter from 1899 to 1937, then A.W.'s son Hartwell Carter. Already one of the largest owned by a single person (the King Ranch was owned by a corporation), the Carters expanded the operation further through the 20th century.
Smart was sent to Los Gatos High School and become interested in theater.

Show business
Smart became a nightclub singer and performed in plays and musicals from 1933–1939. Director Joshua Logan hired him for the Broadway theatre production of Two for the Show in 1940. and he performed in The Merry Widow. 
Smart married actress Patricia Havens-Monteagle from Burlingame, California July 3, 1936 who lived in Beverly Hills, California. Known as Pat Monteagle, she appeared un-credited in the 1936 movie The Great Ziegfeld, but was more well known as a socialite. 
The family moved to Honolulu later in 1940, but then lived in California after the Attack on Pearl Harbor. About  of the ranch were leased to the United States Marines for use as Camp Tarawa. The second and fifth divisions trained there.
He was divorced in 1944.

After the war he appeared under the name Dick Smart. In 1946 and 1947, he starred in the Broadway production of Bloomer Girl with Nanette Fabray and All for Love in 1949. 
Over nearly 30 years, Smart performed on Broadway and in cabarets in the U.S. and abroad. He headlined such clubs as the Coconut Grove in Los Angeles, the Monte Carlo in New York and Le Lido in Paris. After A.W. Carter died in 1949, Smart took a more active role in the ranch.

Back to the ranch
As traditional cattle ranching began to lose money, Smart modernized and diversified the ranch's operation. In 1965 he leased land to Laurance Rockefeller for building the Mauna Kea Beach Hotel on Kaunaoa Bay of the Kohala Coast. It was land too dry for cattle, but popular with tourists. He opened a visitors center and museum, and developed entire new towns such as Waikoloa Village on his landholdings. His wealth was an estimated $400 million in 1990.

Starting in 1979 he built the 490-seat Kahilu theater (named after his mother's Hawaiian name) in the town of Waimea, on ranch land, where he performed in occasional productions.

In 1987, Smart sponsored a production of the Jerry Herman musical revue Showtune (then titled Tune the Grand Up) at the Kahilu Theatre.  This was the first production of Showtune away from the United States mainland.

His most recent performance was in a one-man musical entitled "Richard Smart Remembers". Smart died July 4, 1992, in Oahu of cancer after a short illness.
His estate was left in a trust to benefit North Hawaii Community Hospital, Hawaii Preparatory Academy, Hawaii Community Foundation, and Parker School.
James Michener said:Richard Smart is clearly a talented man. But what really impresses me is how much he is respected by the local people–particularly the native Hawaiians who work for him.

Son Gilliard "Gil" Smart died in 1999, leaving daughter Willow Parker Smart.
Antony Parker Smart was born August 8, 1937. Antony died June 26, 2007 in Honolulu, leaving daughter Stefanie Lee Havens Smart and son Parker Damon Smart. Stefanie Smart died on August 17, 2011.

Sexuality
Despite having married and fathered two children, there is reason to believe Smart was queer. His marriage ended in a divorce in 1944 and he never remarried despite continuing to live to 1992.   S, George W. Parker III, wrote something relevant in his memoirs 2009.     Parker wrote he learned Smart was gay via a mutual acquaintance, who was once married to René Coty, of the Coty perfume family.  She  reports told him "Smart was gay" at least while she knew him when he was living on the French Riviera. There is no doubt Smart spent considerable amounts of time in France and beginning in 1950 he started making frequent trips to Europe spending most of his time singing and dancing at the Lido Club in Paris.

Apolonio told Parker that his first job after graduating from MIT was to serve as a tutor for Smart in Hawaii. Parker, who was not gay, but a longtime friend of Ap, who was gay, might have influenced Richard Smart. 

A Hawaii Island resident wrote "Smart who died in the last few years was gay. He was very progressive and did wonders for the Big Island helping the poor folks out some."   On this same forum in reply another Hawaii resident in September 2009 wrote "I knew Richard Smart was gay."

Smart's sexuality was again a topic, albeit glossed over, in a new book that came out about him in October 2011.

Family tree

George W.Parker was not related to Richard Smart, though he served in The Marine Corps and was stationed on the Parker Ranch with the Second Division in 1944. His friend, Norman Apolonio, after his graduation from MIT served as tutor to Richard Smart.
Richard Smart had two sons, Antony Smart, and Gilliard Smart. Gilliard Smart had daughter Willow Parker Smart, and Antony fathered Stefanie Havens Smart, and Parker Smart.

References

Further reading

External links 
 

1913 births
1992 deaths
American male musical theatre actors
Male actors from Honolulu
20th-century American male actors
Nightclub performers
American people of Native Hawaiian descent
20th-century American singers
20th-century American businesspeople
Ranchers from Hawaii
20th-century American male singers